Fashist ('Fascist') was a Russian fascist publication, issued from Putnam, Connecticut, United States. It was published by Anastasy Vonsyatsky. Fashist was distributed among Russian exiles around the world.

Launching
The first issue of Fashist was published in August 1933. The first issue was printed in 2,000 copies. Donat Yosefovich Kunle was the editor of Fashist. The publication functioned as an organ of the All-Russian Fascist Organization.

Profile
Fashist was published more or less on a monthly basis. Each issue was printed in roughly 10,000 copies. The publication had a newspaper format, but was printed on costly glossy paper. The material of the publication consisted of reports on party activities as well as historical narratives. Fashist dedicated a lot of attention to Civil War nostalgia, praising the role of the White Army and its leaders.

Fashkors
Many authors of articles in Fashist were kept anonymous, to avoid reprisals from Soviet agents. Instead, they signed the articles as fashkor (фашкор, short for 'Fascist Correspondent', compare with rabkor) followed by their party membership number and geographic location. By using the pseudonyms of many different fashkors, Fashist created the impression of being in the epicentre of a vast global network of émigré Russian fascist agents as well as a network of saboteurs with the Soviet Union. In reality, Vonsyatsky could count on only a handful of Russian exiles as correspondents.

Later period
As of 1938–39, it served as the organ of the All-Russian National Revolutionary Workers-Peasants Party of Fascists. Fashist ceased publication in July 1941.

References

1933 establishments in Connecticut
Monthly magazines published in the United States
Defunct political magazines published in the United States
Fascist newspapers and magazines
Magazines established in 1933
Magazines disestablished in 1941
Magazines published in Connecticut
Putnam, Connecticut
Fascism in Russia
Russian-language magazines
White Russian emigration